Hossein Askari (born March 23, 1975 in Khomeyn) is an Iranian former professional racing cyclist, who competed professionally between 2005 and 2016 for the , ,  and  teams. During his career, Askari was suspended for one year for doping in 2013 and 2014.

Doping
Askari tested positive for methylhexaneamine during the 2013 Tour de Singkarak and was given a one year suspension.

Major results

1999
 6th Overall Tour of Saudi Arabia
2000
 9th Tour of Azerbaijan
2001
 3rd Overall Tour of Saudi Arabia
2002
 2nd  Team pursuit, Asian Games
 8th Overall Tour of Saudi Arabia
2004
 2nd  Time trial, Asian Road Championships
 2nd  Individual pursuit, Asian Track Championships
 2nd Overall Presidential Cycling Tour of Turkey
2005
 1st Overall Kerman Tour
 1st Overall Tour de Indonesia
1st Stage 3
 1st Prologue Tour of Azerbaijan (Iran)
 Asian Road Championships
2nd  Time trial
6th Road race
 2nd  Individual pursuit, Asian Track Championships
 8th Overall Tour de East Java
 8th Overall Tour de Taiwan
2006
 2nd Overall 2005–06 UCI Asia Tour
 Asian Games
2nd  Team time trial
7th Road race
 2nd Time trial, National Road Championships
 2nd Overall Tour of Thailand
 2nd Overall Kerman Tour
1st Stages 2 & 4
 2nd Overall Presidential Cycling Tour of Turkey
 2nd Overall Tour de East Java
 2nd Overall Tour of Qinghai Lake
 4th Road race, Asian Road Championships
 4th Overall Tour of Azerbaijan (Iran)
1st Stage 2
2007
 1st  Time trial, National Road Championships
 1st Overall 2006–07 UCI Asia Tour
 1st Overall Tour of Azerbaijan (Iran)
1st Stage 2
 1st Stage 2 Kerman Tour
 Asian Road Championships
2nd  Road race
2nd  Time trial
 2nd Overall Jelajah Malaysia
1st Stage 4
 3rd Overall Presidential Cycling Tour of Turkey
1st Mountains classification
 3rd Overall Tour de East Java
 3rd Overall Milad De Nour Tour
 6th Overall Tour of Siam
 6th Overall Tour de Hokkaido
 10th Overall Tour de Langkawi
2008
 1st  Time trial, National Road Championships
 1st Overall 2007–08 UCI Asia Tour
 1st Overall International Emirates Post Tour
 1st Overall Tour of Azerbaijan (Iran)
1st Stages 2 (TTT) & 6
 3rd Overall Tour of Qinghai Lake
 4th Overall Jelajah Malaysia
1st Mountains classification
1st Stage 6
 4th Overall Tour de East Java
 9th Overall International Presidency Tour
2009
 1st Stage 1 International Presidency Tour
 2nd Overall Tour of Azerbaijan (Iran)
 3rd Overall Tour de East Java
 4th Overall Jelajah Malaysia
 4th Overall Tour de Indonesia
1st Stage 1 (TTT)
 5th Overall Milad De Nour Tour
 7th Road race, Asian Road Championships
2010
 1st  Time trial, National Road Championships
 1st Overall International Presidency Tour
1st Stage 4
 1st Overall Tour of Qinghai Lake
 1st Stage 1 (TTT) Tour de Singkarak
 2nd  Time trial, Asian Road Championships
 2nd Overall Tour de Singkarak
 3rd Overall Tour de Langkawi
 3rd Overall Tour of Azerbaijan (Iran)
 5th Overall Tour of China
 10th Mumbai Cyclothon
2011
 1st  Time trial, National Road Championships
 2nd Overall Tour of Azerbaijan (Iran)
1st Stage 3
 Asian Road Championships
3rd  Road race
3rd  Time trial
 4th Overall Milad De Nour Tour
 6th Overall Tour of Qinghai Lake
 7th Overall International Presidency Tour
 8th Overall Tour de Langkawi
 8th Overall Kerman Tour
2012
 1st Overall Tour de Brunei
1st Stage 2
 3rd  Time trial, Asian Road Championships
 3rd Overall Tour of Azerbaijan (Iran)
 5th Overall Tour of Qinghai Lake
2013
 4th Overall Tour de Filipinas
 4th Overall Tour of Borneo
7th Overall Tour de Singkarak
1st Stage 1
2014
 2nd Overall Tour de Ijen
 3rd  Time trial, Asian Games
2015
 Asian Cycling Championships
1st  Road race
1st  Time trial
 1st  Time trial, National Road Championships
 2nd Overall Tour de Taiwan
 3rd Overall Tour of Japan
 3rd Overall Tour de Singkarak
1st Stage 6
 5th Overall Tour of Fuzhou
 6th Overall Tour de Filipinas
1st Mountains classification
 6th Overall Tour of Iran (Azerbaijan)
1st  Points classification
1st Stage 4

References

External links

Tour of Azerbaijan (Iran) winners
1975 births
Living people
Iranian male cyclists
Iranian track cyclists
Cyclists at the 2000 Summer Olympics
Cyclists at the 2004 Summer Olympics
Cyclists at the 2008 Summer Olympics
Doping cases in cycling
Iranian sportspeople in doping cases
Olympic cyclists of Iran
People from Markazi Province
Asian Games silver medalists for Iran
Asian Games bronze medalists for Iran
Asian Games medalists in cycling
Cyclists at the 1994 Asian Games
Cyclists at the 1998 Asian Games
Cyclists at the 2002 Asian Games
Cyclists at the 2006 Asian Games
Cyclists at the 2010 Asian Games
Cyclists at the 2014 Asian Games
Medalists at the 2002 Asian Games
Medalists at the 2006 Asian Games
Medalists at the 2010 Asian Games
Medalists at the 2014 Asian Games
21st-century Iranian people